The First Parish Church is a historic Unitarian Universalist (formerly Congregationalist) church at Tremont and Depot Streets in Duxbury, Massachusetts.  First Parish Church is currently a member congregation of the Unitarian Universalist Association.

History 
The original Duxbury congregation was founded in 1632 by Elder William Brewster as a Christian Separatist church with early members coming from the First Parish Church in Plymouth, the oldest church in New England. In the beginning, the church likely met in congregants' homes until the first meeting house was built near what is today known as Miles Standish Burial Ground.  The Duxbury congregation became a parish church of Massachusetts' Congregationalist state church.  A schism developed at the turn of the 19th century, when much of the congregation adopted Unitarianism along with many of the other state churches in Massachusetts. State churches were officially disaffiliated with the Massachusetts government in 1834. The current church building was constructed in 1840. The building was added to the National Register of Historic Places in 1978.

Images

See also 
First Parish Church in Plymouth
National Register of Historic Places listings in Plymouth County, Massachusetts

References

External links 
 First Parish of Duxbury official website
 The records from 1825–1846 of the First Parish Church are in the Andover-Harvard Theological Library at Harvard Divinity School in Cambridge, Massachusetts.

Unitarian Universalist churches in Massachusetts
Churches completed in 1840
19th-century Unitarian Universalist church buildings
1632 establishments in Massachusetts
Duxbury, Massachusetts
Churches on the National Register of Historic Places in Massachusetts
17th-century Protestant churches
Churches in Plymouth County, Massachusetts
National Register of Historic Places in Plymouth County, Massachusetts